Shouwu Wan  is a black pill used in Traditional Chinese medicine to "replenish the liver and the kidney, strengthen the tendons and bones, and blacken the hair". It tastes sweet and slightly bitter. It is used where there is "deficiency syndrome of the liver and the kidney marked by dizziness, blurring of vision, tinnitus, aching of the loins, numbness of limbs and premature greying of hair and beard, and hyperlipemia". The binding agent is honey.

Chinese classic herbal formula

See also
 Chinese classic herbal formula
 Bu Zhong Yi Qi Wan

References

Traditional Chinese medicine pills